Nour Elayoubi (born 16 January 1997) is an Egyptian synchronised swimmer. She competed in the team event at the 2016 Summer Olympics.

References

External links
 

1997 births
Living people
Egyptian synchronized swimmers
Olympic synchronized swimmers of Egypt
Synchronized swimmers at the 2016 Summer Olympics
Place of birth missing (living people)